East Buttress may refer to:

 a high point and a prominent point of Denali, Alaska
 one of the buttresses of Clogwyn Du'r Arddu, Wales
 one of the crags of Scafell, England
 a climbing route in Middle Cathedral Rock, Yosemite Valley, California
 a climbing route in Middle Triple Peak, Alaska